Kosta Petrović (31 May 1891 – 1965) was a Yugoslav architect. His work was part of the architecture event in the art competition at the 1936 Summer Olympics.

References

1891 births
1965 deaths
Yugoslav architects
Olympic competitors in art competitions
People from Klanjec